The imperfect, or past imperfective, is a verb form in linguistics.

Imperfect or imperfection may also refer to:

Film and TV
 Imperfect (2012 film), a 2012 Singaporean film
 Imperfect (2019 film), a 2019 Indonesian film
 An Imperfection, a 2015 Sri Lankan Canadian film 
 "Imperfection" (Star Trek: Voyager), a TV episode
 The Imperfects, an 2022 TV series

Music
Imperfectly, a 1992 album by singer-songwriter Ani DiFranco
Imperfection, 2004 album by Real Life
"Imperfect", song by Joi Cardwell
"Imperfection", 2008 song by Glenn Hughes from First Underground Nuclear Kitchen
"Imperfection" (Evanescence song) from Synthesis
"Imperfection", 2015 song by Tinchy Stryder featuring vocals by Fuse ODG
"Imperfection", song by Skillet from Collide
"Imperfection", song by Gentleman from Aloe Blacc discography
"Imperfections" (song), song by Celine Dion from Courage
"Imperfections", song by Josh Osho from L.i.f.e
"Imperfections", a song by Pop Smoke from Shoot for the Stars, Aim for the Moon

Other uses 
Imperfectualism, 2020 art book created by Lorin Morgan-Richards
 the imperfective aspect in linguistics
 Imperfect group, a group with no nontrivial perfect quotients
 The Imperfects, a group of fictional supervillains from Marvel Nemesis: Rise of the Imperfects

See also